Shukla Chandrashekhar Ramakrishna (SCR) Bhatt is an Indian musician. He was trained in Swaragyan. His guru was  Krishnabhat Honnawar belonging to the Patiala Gharana. He was also trained under Annasaheb. Bhat received the title of "Sangeet Acharya", Due to his Exceptionally Distinctive Teaching skills and Command over known and rare ragas. The title was given by Swamiji of Sri Vallabh Shikshan Sangeet ashram based in Sion.  Pandit SCR Bhat was the senior most and dedicated disciple of Shrikrishna Narayan Ratanjankar.Shrikrishna Narayan Ratanjankar was also known as Padmabhushan Acharya Ratanjankar.

Bhat trained many musicians Talat Mahmood. Pt. K.G.Ginde, Pt. Dinkar Kaikini, Pt. Yashwant Mahale, Pt. C.R.Vyas, Ulhas Bapat, Smt. Zarine Sharma (Daruwala), Sunil Kant Gupta-flautist.

Early life 
He was born in Shirali, Karnataka. SCR has his initial training at Swaragyan that lasted over 2 years.  Later Krishnabhat put Bhat under the tutelage of Padmabhushan Dr. S.N Ratanjankar for further advanced training in music from whom he learnt for more than 35 years. He received the title of Mahamahopadhyaya and Sharang Dev.

Awards 
 Tansen Sanman(1993).
 Karnataka Sangeet Academy award(1999-2000).

References 

Indian musicians
Recipients of the Sangeet Natak Akademi Award